Aleksandr Ivanovich Galkin (4 September 1948 – 4 November 2018) was a Russian professional football player and coach.

External links
 Career summary by KLISF

1948 births
2018 deaths
Soviet footballers
Soviet football managers
Russian football managers
Association football defenders
FC Avangard Kursk players